Momoyama may refer to:

History
Azuchi–Momoyama period, the final phase of the Sengoku period in Japanese history 1568–1600

People
Ion Momoyama, Japanese singer and voice actor
Momoyama Kenichi (1909–1991), Korean prince and cavalry officer in the Japanese Imperial Army

Places
Momoyama Castle, a castle in Fushimi Ward, Kyoto, Japan
Momoyama Gakuin University, an Anglican university in Osaka, Japan
Momoyama Station,  railway station in Fushimi-ku, Kyoto, Kyoto Prefecture, Japan
Momoyama, Wakayama, a town in Naga District, Nakayama Prefecture, Japan